Sibylla is a genus of mantises in the family Hymenopodidae and characteristic of the subfamily Sibyllinae.

Description
Sibylla species have a long and thin prothorax with lateral and dorsal projections. The head bears an erect process with four sideways spikes.

Classification
The Mantodea Species File lists:
Subgenus Sibylla
Sibylla dives (Giglio-Tos, 1915)
Sibylla dolosa (Roy, 1975)
Sibylla gratiosa (Rehn, 1912)
Sibylla limbata (Giglio-Tos, 1915)
Sibylla maculosa (Roy, 1996)
Sibylla marmorata (Roy, 1996)
Sibylla polyacantha (Gerstaecker, 1889)
Sibylla pretiosa (Stål, 1856) - type species
Subgenus Sibyllopsis
Sibylla griffinii (Giglio-Tos, 1915)
Sibylla operosa (Roy, 1996)
Sibylla pannulata (Karsch 1894)
Sibylla punctata (Roy, 1996)
Sibylla vanderplaetseni (Roy, 1963)

See also
List of mantis genera and species

References

Mantodea genera
Sibyllidae
Taxa named by Carl Stål